Rogombé is a surname. Notable people with the surname include:

Romaric Rogombé (born 1990), Gabonese footballer 
Rose Francine Rogombé (1942–2015), Gabonese politician 

Surnames of African origin